KHSC-LD, virtual and UHF digital channel 16, is a low-powered television station licensed to Fresno, California, United States. The station is a translator of KJOI-LP (104.3 FM).

History

KHSC originally appeared as KHST on channel 66, then later as KHSC-LP on channel 38, before moving to channel 16. It was originally affiliated with the Home Shopping Network.

The KHSC calls were originally used by a Los Angeles HSN O&O station on channel 46 from the mid-1980s until 2002, when it was sold to Univision and became Telefutura affiliate KFTR-TV.

The station became digital in 2014 and the HSN affiliation was moved to the fourth digital subchannel of sister station KGMC (channel 43).

External links

HSC
Television channels and stations established in 1980
Low-power television stations in the United States